"Learning a Lot About Love" is a single by Canadian country music artist Jason McCoy. Released in 1995, it was the fifth single from his album Jason McCoy. The song reached #1 on the RPM Country Tracks chart in November 1995.

Content
McCoy said he wrote the song about when he and his wife had a fight before they were married and his mom said "well, I guess you're learning about love, aren't you?"

Chart performance

Year-end charts

References

1995 singles
Jason McCoy songs
1995 songs
Songs written by Jason McCoy